Sean Connors (born February 5, 1969) is an American Democratic Party politician, who served one term in the New Jersey General Assembly from 2012 to 2014, where he represented the 33rd Legislative District. Connors served in the Assembly on the Consumer Affairs Law Committee and the Public Safety Committee.

Born at Margaret Hague Maternity Hospital in Jersey City, Connors lives in the city's Jersey City Heights neighborhood. He attended Hudson County Community College after his graduation from Hudson Catholic Regional High School. Connors is a Detective serving with the Jersey City Police Department, having achieved the rank in 2002 after joining the department in 1994. From 2009 to 2012, he served on the Board of education of the Jersey City Public Schools.

District 33
Each of the forty districts in the New Jersey Legislature has one representative in the New Jersey Senate and two members in the New Jersey General Assembly. The other representatives from the 33rd District for the 2012-2013 Legislative Session are:
Senator Brian P. Stack, and
Assemblyman Ruben J. Ramos

References

External links
Assemblyman Connors' Legislative Webpage, New Jersey Legislature
New Jersey Legislature financial disclosure forms
2012 2011

Living people
1969 births
American police officers
Hudson County Community College alumni
Democratic Party members of the New Jersey General Assembly
Politicians from Jersey City, New Jersey
21st-century American politicians